Cryptocarya woodii, the Cape quince, is a shrub or small forest tree, native to southern and eastern Africa. Its Latin name commemorates John Medley Wood, a botanist in Natal. From mid summer the tree bears small, inconspicuous flowers. The ripe fruit have a bumpy surface and are shiny, purple-black in colour. When a leaf is viewed against light some minute secretory glands are visible in the vein polygons (areolae). The larvae of Papilio euphranor and Charaxes xiphares breed on the foliage of this tree.

References

External links
 Cryptocarya woodii, Green Planet

Trees of Africa
Flora of Mozambique
Flora of Southern Africa
Garden plants of Africa
woodii